Michael Ankeny (born January 17, 1991 in Deephaven, Minnesota) is an American alpine ski racer.

References

1991 births
Living people
American male alpine skiers
People from Deephaven, Minnesota
Sportspeople from the Minneapolis–Saint Paul metropolitan area
21st-century American people